Ginés González García (born 31 August 1945) is an Argentine medical doctor who served twice as the country's Minister of Health under President Alberto Fernández, from 2019 to 2021, and under the successive presidencies of Eduardo Duhalde and Néstor Kirchner, from 2002 to 2007. A specialist on public healthcare, González García also served as Argentine Ambassador to Chile from 2007 to 2015.

Career
González García was born in San Nicolás de los Arroyos, Buenos Aires Province, and graduated as a surgeon at the National University of Córdoba. He first entered public service as the Minister of Health of Buenos Aires Province from 1988 to 1991. He was appointed Argentina's Minister of Health in January 2002, days after the congressional appointment of interim President Eduardo Duhalde, and ratified in his post by President Néstor Kirchner upon taking office in May 2003.

Minister of Health
González García became the focus of a controversy in February 2005, when he was verbally attacked by the head military chaplain, Bishop Antonio Baseotto, because of the minister's public support of the legalization of abortion in Argentina (where interrupting a pregnancy was at the time a serious crime except when the mother's life was in grave danger, or in cases of rape of a mentally impaired woman), as well as his endorsement of sex education and his implementation of a program of free contraception and condom distribution programs. The dispute underscored both the influence of the Roman Catholic Church in Argentina, as well as the factious nature of local church-state relations themselves.

On December 12, 2019, two days after returning as Argentina's Minister of Health, González García issued a protocol expanding hospital abortion access to pregnancies which resulted from rape. In addition, the protocol provides that girls as young as 13 years of age can have abortions in such cases without the consent of either of their parents. The protocol also weakens a doctor's ability to refuse to perform such abortions due to personal objection as well.

Covid-19 Vaccination Scandal 

Ginés González García was forced to resign as Health Minister on 19 February 2021 after it was revealed that he provided preferential treatment for the COVID-19 vaccine to his close friends, including journalist Horacio Verbitsky and other political figures. He was succeeded by the second-in-charge Carla Vizzotti. The revelation was met with wide national condemnation, from supporters and opposition, as Argentina had at the time received only 1,5 million doses of vaccine for its population of 40 million.

Argentine Ambassador to Chile 

Ginés González García was appointed as Argentine Ambassador to Chile by president Cristina Fernández de Kirchner on December 24, 2007. He was in office until December 10, 2015 and was succeeded by José Octavio Bordón List of ambassadors of Argentina to Chile.

References

1945 births
Living people
People from San Nicolás de los Arroyos
Argentine people of Spanish descent
National University of Córdoba alumni
Argentine surgeons
Justicialist Party politicians
Argentine ministers of health
Ambassadors of Argentina to Chile
Argentine diplomats